The National Film Academy was launched in 1999 as an academy that supports, mentors, and promotes filmmakers, actors, actresses, and talent in the United Kingdom. The National Film Academy is also responsible for the annual National Film Awards UK.

References

Film schools in the United Kingdom
Education in London